The year 1641 in science and technology involved some significant events.

Medicine
 Nicolaes Tulp's Observationes Medicae is published in Amsterdam.

Technology
 The sealed thermometer is developed with Ferdinand II, Grand Duke of Tuscany, using a glass tube containing alcohol, which freezes well below the freezing point of water.
 Samuel Winslow is granted the first patent in North America by the Massachusetts General Court for a new saltmaking process.

Births
 March – Menno van Coehoorn, Dutch military engineer (died 1704)
 July 30 – Regnier de Graaf, Dutch physician and anatomist who discovered the ovarian follicles, which were later named Graafian follicles (died 1673)
 September 26 – Nehemiah Grew, English botanist and physician who made some of the early microscopical observations of plants (died 1712)

Deaths
 January 3 – Jeremiah Horrocks, English astronomer (born 1618)
 March 8 – Xu Xiake, Chinese explorer and geographer (born 1587)
 July 5 – Simon Baskerville, English physician (born 1574)
 Guy de La Brosse, French physician and botanist (born c. 1586)

References

 
17th century in science
1640s in science